Higuita is a surname. Notable people with the surname include:

 Cristian Higuita (born 1994), Colombian footballer
 Leo Higuita (born 1986 as Leonardo de Melo Vieira Leite), Kazakhstani futsal player
 René Higuita (born 1966), Colombian footballer